Aryan is a 1988 Indian Malayalam-language action crime film directed by Priyadarshan and written by T. Damodaran. The film stars Mohanlal, Ramya Krishnan, Sharat Saxena, Shobana, Sreenivasan, Gavin Packard, M. G. Soman and Goga Kapoor. It was produced by Mohanlal and Century Kochumon through the company Cheers Films. Aryan tells the tale of an underworld battle and family bonds through Devanarayanan who arrives in Bombay with nothing and rises to become a gangster in a powerful crime gang.

Aryan was one of the highest-grossing Malayalam films of the year. It ran for over 100 days in theatres. Mohanlal won the Kerala State Film Award – Special Jury Award for acting. The film was dubbed in Hindi as Aaryan Mera Naam. Aryan was remade in Tamil as Dravidan (1989), in Telugu as Ashoka Chakravarthy. It was remade in Kannada as Chakravarthy (1990). Saxena reprised his role in all the versions.

Plot
Devanarayanan (Devan) is a Brahmin priest from Kerala, who has to look after his entire impoverished family. He is in love with Aswathy, but her corrupt father Govindan Nair is against their relationship. The wicked local businessman Arumukhan, along with Govindan Nair, Inspector Chandrappan, and their coterie of corrupt men of influential positions falsely accuse Devanarayanan of the theft of the local temple's Thiruvabharana (Deity's ornaments) and fabricate him in the case. Devan's father loses his trust on his son and Devan is forced to leave his village.

He reaches Bombay where he gets shelter from Mohammad and his daughter Sainaba, who runs a tea shop. Some turn of events draws Devanarayanan into the underworld and he becomes the trusted aide of an ageing don Kareem, who had lost his wife, brother, and uncle in an underworld gang war decades ago. Sainaba is in love with Kareem's only son. Their marriage gets fixed when Devan convinces both Kareem and Mohammed.

Nirmala, who is working for Kareem's gang, gets closer to Devanarayanan. Nair, who was a trusted secretary to Kareem, joins hands together with the rival don Majeed Khan after feeling jealous and dejected when Kareem starts giving more importance to Devan. Kareem's son and daughter-in-law Sainaba, along with Mohammed are shot dead by Majeed Khan, Nair, and their henchmen during the Holi celebrations, leaving Kareem on a path towards religion and leaving all underworld business for good.

Majeed Khan and Nair plan to leave Bombay, but Devan successfully attacks them and gets them arrested. Devan is then sentenced to a five-year imprisonment. After he gets released, Devan along with his lover Nirmala leave for Kerala. He proves his innocence to his parents and family and teaches a lesson to all those wicked men who had once fabricated him.

But, by that time, Majeed Khan and Nair reach Kerala to take revenge from Devan and kill Nirmala. Devan kills both Khan and Nair. The film ends tragically with a furious Devanarayanan screaming at the judge in the court of law for having been imprisoned under fabricated accusations.

Cast

 Mohanlal as Devanarayanan Namboothiri / Devan, a commoner-turned-gangster
 Ramya Krishnan as Nirmala / Nimmi
 Shobhana as Aswathy Antharjanam
 Sharat Saxena as Majeed Khan, a powerful underworld don in Mumbai
 Goga Kapoor as Kareem Seth, an aged powerful underworld don in Mumbai 
 Kundara Johny as Nair, ex-secretary to Kareem, later Majeed Khan's henchman
 Sreenivasan as 'Sakhavu' Karunan, a corrupt politician
 M. G. Soman as Arumukhan
 Innocent as Govindan Nair, Aswathy's father 
 Maniyanpilla Raju as Adv. Radhakrishnan, Aswathy's husband and Govindan's son in law
 Sukumari as Thampuratti, Devan's mother
 Thikkurissy Sukumaran Nair as Namboothiri Thampuran, Devan's father
 Kuthiravattam Pappu as Hassan
 Balan K. Nair as Mohammad
 Monisha as Sainaba/Sainu, Mohammed's daughter
 Gavin Packard as Martin, a local goon
 Priya as Subhadra, Devan's younger sister
 Sithara as Dhathrikutty, Devan's youngest sister
 Sreenath as Unnikrishnan, Dhathrikutty's husband and Devan's brother in law
 C.I. Paul as Inspector Chandrappan, a corrupt police officer and Aramukhan's accomplice
 Kaithapram Damodaran Namboothiri as Oikyan, Devan's 'Guru'
 Milind Gawali as Salim, Kareem's son and Sainaba's husband
 Bob Christo as Tony, a Goon

Soundtrack
The music was composed by Raghu Kumar and the lyrics were written by Kaithapram.

Box office
The film was a commercial success, becoming one of the highest-grossing Malayalam films of the year. It ran for over 100 days in theatres.

Remake
Aryan was later remade in Tamil as Dravidan (1989) by Suresh Balaje, with Sathyaraj playing the lead role. It was also remade in Telugu as Ashoka Chakravarthy (1989) starring Nandamuri Balakrishna and unofficially as Dhruva Nakshatram (1989) both of which were released on the same day, and in Kannada as Chakravarthy (1990) starring Ambareesh.

References

External links
 
 Aryan on MalayalaChalachithram.com
 Aryan on MalayalaSangeetham.com
 Aryan on SpicyOnion.com
 Article about the film in Deepika

1980s Malayalam-language films
Films scored by Reghu Kumar
1988 films
Films directed by Priyadarshan
Films with screenplays by T. Damodaran
Indian gangster films
Films about organised crime in India
Fictional portrayals of the Maharashtra Police
Fictional portrayals of the Kerala Police
Films shot in Mumbai
Films shot in Kozhikode
Malayalam films remade in other languages